USS Sussex is a name used more than once by the U.S. Navy:

 , a steamer acquired by the Navy on 5 May 1917.
 , a cargo ship commissioned on 27 May 1947.

References 

United States Navy ship names